The Cincinnati Business Courier is a business-oriented newspaper published weekly in Cincinnati, Ohio. It is published by American City Business Journals, who acquired it in 1986  with the purchase of Business Journal Publications Corp. The Courier print edition has a circulation of more than 50,000 business owners, professionals and decision makers, and more than 10,000 email subscribers receive a free daily news update. Back issues (to 1996) are available for consultation at the Cincinnati Public Library The Courier is represented on the Advisory Board of the Goering Centre, Carl H. Lindner College of Business, University of Cincinnati.

See also
Media in Cincinnati

External links
Cincinnati Business Courier

References

Newspapers published in Cincinnati
Business newspapers published in the United States